The Anderson Servants are an amateur baseball team that competes in the Great Lakes Summer Collegiate League (GLSCL), which is one of eight leagues formed under the National Alliance of College Summer Baseball (NACSB).  (The NACSB is responsible for other high-profile leagues such as the Cape Cod Baseball League.) 

Anderson, along with nine other teams between Indiana, Michigan, and Ohio, use wood-bats, just as in professional baseball.  The GLSCL is one of only nine leagues throughout the United States to do so.  The use of wood-bats in summer baseball leagues gives top collegiate baseball players the opportunity to hone their skills, and showcase their talents and abilities in front of scouts from professional baseball.  However, the players are not paid to play, so as to maintain their NCAA eligibility.  All Anderson Servants games, as the rest of the GLSCL games, are played by NCAA Baseball Rules.

The Servants' roster is made up of players from around the U.S.  They play their home games at Memorial Field in the city of Fishers, Indiana.

References

External links 

Servants Official Website
GLSCL Official Website

Amateur baseball teams in Indiana